This is a list of Major Sites Protected for their Historical and Cultural Value at the National Level in the Province of Hainan, People's Republic of China.

|}

As well as sites protected at the national level, there are 108 sites in Hainan that are protected at the provincial level (see 海南省文物保护单位).

See also

 Principles for the Conservation of Heritage Sites in China
 Nandu River Iron Bridge

References

 
Hainan